Kane and Abel may refer to:

 Kane and Abel (novel), the 1979 novel by Jeffrey Archer
 Kane and Abel (miniseries), a 1985 miniseries starring Peter Strauss as Rosnovski and Sam Neill as Kane
 Kane & Abel (group), an American rap duo from New Orleans

See also 
 Cain and Abel (disambiguation)
 "Kanes and Abel's", the seventeenth episode of the first season of the American mystery television series Veronica Mars